Pavan K. Varma (born 5 November 1953) is an Indian diplomat, politician, and author who served as an ambassador to Bhutan and Cyprus.

Early life and education 
Varma was born in Nagpur. He earned a degree in history from St. Stephen's College, Delhi and a degree in law from the Faculty of Law, University of Delhi.

Career

Politics and diplomacy 
Varna joined the Indian Foreign Service in 1976. During his career, he has served as press secretary to the president of India, spokesman of the Ministry of External Affairs, joint secretary for Africa, high commissioner for India in Cyprus, director of the Nehru Centre, director general of the Indian Council for Cultural Relations, and ambassador of India to Bhutan.

Beginning in June 2014, he served a member of parliament, Rajya Sabha, until July 2016. He was the national general secretary and national spokesman of the Janata Dal (United) JD(U) party.

Varma was the national general Secretary of the JD(U) until 29 January 2020. He joined the Trinamool Congress on 23 November 2021 and was appointed the national vice-president of the party on 19 December 2021. However with the formation of Mahagathbandhan government in Bihar, he left Trinamool Congress and resigned from the post of vice-president on 12 August 2022.

Writing 
He has written over a dozen best selling, books including Krishna: The Playful Divine (Penguin) on India's most popular deity, a biography of the Urdu poet Mirza Ghalib, Ghalib: The Man, The Times (Penguin), and the Havelis of Old Delhi. His first book on a contemporary subject was The Great Indian Middle Class (Penguin) (published also in French), followed by Being Indian: The Truth About Why the 21st Century Will Be India's (Viking/Penguin 2004). Another work is an adaptation of Vatsyayana's Kama Sutra, which was published early in 2007 by Roli Books.

Varma has also translated the poetry of Kaifi Azmi, Atal Bihari Vajpayee, and Gulzar (four volumes), all published by Penguin.

His book, Becoming Indian: The Unfinished Revolution of Culture and Identity (Penguin-Allen Lane) was launched in February 2010 and deals with issues of culture and identity for postcolonial societies.

Varma's first work of fiction When Loss is Gain was launched in January 2012 by Aleph and is now to be made into a Bollywood film.

Gulzar's translation of Varma's epic poem, Yudhister & Draupadi, was released in November 2013 by Penguin and has now been adapted into a play.

Varma's book Chanakya's New Manifesto: To Resolve the Crisis within India was launched by Aleph in January 2013. His book, The New Indian Middle Class: The Challenge of 2014 and Beyond, was published by Harper-Collins in 2014. His book Chanakya's View: Understanding India in Transition (Westland-Amazon) was published in 2019. His book The Greatest Ode to Lord Ram: Tulsidas's Ramcharitmanas (Westland-Amazon) was launched in 2020.

Varma's book, Adi Shankaracharya: Hinduism's Greatest Thinker (Westland-Amazon), was launched in April 2018 and won the Bengaluru Literature Festival prize for the Best Book of Non-Fiction for 2018. In 2018 he was also conferred an Honorary Doctorate by the Sri Sharada Institute of Indian Management for his book Adi Shankaracharya: Hinduism's Greatest Thinker (Westland-Amazon).

Varma's columns appear regularly in The Times of India, The Asian Age and several other publications.

Awards and honors 
Varma was conferred an Honorary Doctoral Degree for his contribution to the fields of diplomacy, literature, culture, and aesthetics by the University of Indianapolis in 2005. Mr. Varma was also awarded by His Majesty the King of Bhutan, the Druk Thuksey Award, Bhutan's highest civilian award. He is the only serving Indian Ambassador in Bhutan to have received this award. Mr. Varma has also received the Lifetime Achievement Award by his school, St Xavier's Delhi, and the Distinguished Alumnus Award by St. Stephen's College. In February 2019, he was conferred the First 'Wordsmith Award' by the Words Count Festival in Pune. He has also been awarded the Kalinga International Literary Award for 2019.

Personal life 
Varma lives in Delhi.

Bibliography

Fiction

Non-fiction
 
 
 
 
 
 
 
 
 
 
As a sequel to The Great Indian Middle Class in 1998, he, in association with journalist Renuka Khandekar, published Maximize Your Life: An Action Plan for the Indian Middle Class (Viking 2000). His 2004 Being Indian was published by William Heinemann, in the United Kingdom, as Being Indian: Inside the Real India in March 2005. Adi Shankaracharya: Hinduism's Greatest Thinker has translated and published in various Indian languages.

Translations
 Selected Poems: Kaifi Azmi (Viking/Penguin 2001) is the English translation of the Urdu poems of Kaifi Azmi.
 21 Poems (Viking/Penguin), a translation in English of the Hindi poems of Atal Bihari Vajpayee, the then Prime Minister of India, was published in December 2001.
 Selected Poems: Gulzar (Penguin) a translated collection of the poems of Gulzar into English, one of India's best-known poets, came out in April 2008.
 Neglected Poems, Pavan K. Varma's second volume of the English translations of Gulzar's poems was launched at the Jaipur Literary Festival in January 2012.
 Green Poems: Gulzar, (Penguin, 2014) Pavan K. Varma's third volume of the English translation of Gulzar's poems.
  Suspected Poems: Gulzar, (Penguin, 2017) Pavan K. Varma's fourth volume of the English translation of Gulzar's poems.

Awards
Kalinga International Literary Awards in 2019

References

1953 births
Living people
People from Ghazipur
Ambassadors of India to Bhutan
Rajya Sabha members from Bihar
Janata Dal (United) politicians
High Commissioners of India to Cyprus
Trinamool Congress politicians